Dana Reed Bailey (April 27, 1833 - March 25, 1908) was a politician in Vermont, Wisconsin and South Dakota.

Biography
Bailey was born on April 27, 1833 in Montgomery, Vermont. He became a teacher, lawyer, and politician.

Political career
He was elected as a delegate to the 1868 Republican National Convention. He was elected as State's Attorney of Franklin County, Vermont. From 1871 to 1874, he was a member of the Vermont Senate. After founding Baldwin, Wisconsin, Bailey was a member of the Wisconsin State Senate from 1878 to 1879. He was then Commissioner of St. Croix County, Wisconsin from 1880 to 1882. Bailey was State's Attorney of Minnehaha County, South Dakota from 1890 to 1895.

Bailey died in Sioux Falls, South Dakota on March 25, 1908.  He was buried at Woodlawn Cemetery in Sioux Falls.

References

People from Franklin County, Vermont
People from St. Croix County, Wisconsin
People from Minnehaha County, South Dakota
Republican Party Vermont state senators
Republican Party Wisconsin state senators
Vermont lawyers
State's attorneys in Vermont
South Dakota lawyers
County supervisors in Wisconsin
District attorneys in South Dakota
South Dakota Republicans
1833 births
1908 deaths
Burials in South Dakota
People from Baldwin, Wisconsin
19th-century American politicians